The Altrincham Line is a tram line of the Manchester Metrolink running from Manchester to Altrincham in Greater Manchester. Originally a railway line, it was, along with the Bury Line, converted into a tramway during 1991–92, as part of the first phase of the Metrolink system.

Route

Cornbook stop was opened in 1999 as an interchange stop between the Altrincham and Eccles lines. The line then runs south-west along the former MSJ&AR line, and connects the towns of Stretford and Sale before running to Altrincham. The line uses old railway lines converted to light-rail operation, and has no street-running sections.

The South Manchester and Airport Lines both share tracks with the Altrincham line as far as just south of  where they diverge at a junction.

Both Navigation Road station, and Altrincham Interchange are shared tram/train interchange stations.

History

Pre-Metrolink

The line was originally a railway: The Manchester South Junction and Altrincham Railway (MSJ&AR) which was opened in 1849, and ran between Altrincham and London Road Station (now Piccadilly) in Manchester. With some trains running into  via a connection at Cornbrook.

In response to competition from trams, which were taking away business from the railway, the line was electrified between London Road and Altrincham in 1931 using the 1,500 volt DC overhead system.

By the late 1960s the original 1,500 V DC system had become non-standard, and both the overhead line equipment and the electric rolling stock had reached the end of their working lives, it was clear they would need replacement: In 1971 British Rail converted the line to operate at the now-standard 25 kV AC system, and replaced the 40-year old rolling stock with newer  EMUs, which operated the line for the next 20 years until the line was converted to Metrolink operation in 1991.

Conversion to Metrolink
The Altrincham line was identified by transport planners in the 1980s, as one of the local railway lines in the Greater Manchester area, which could be split off from the main line network and converted to light-rail operation. It was chosen for conversion as part of the first phase of the Metrolink, along with the Manchester Victoria to Bury Line to the north of Manchester: The two previously unconnected lines were to be linked together by a new street-running line across Manchester city-centre, which included a branch to  railway station.

Heavy rail services ended on the Altrincham line on 24 December 1991, in order for the conversion to light rail to begin. The conversion process involved converting the overhead electrification to work at the tramway standard of 750 volts DC, and refurbishing the stations to improve access for the disabled etc. Several stations were renamed: the former Old Trafford became Trafford Bar, while Warwick Road became Old Trafford.

Also, a number of works were carried out in order to separate the line from the heavy rail network:

The former Cheshire Lines Committee viaduct which had run from Cornbrook into the former  station, and had been disused since 1969; was repaired and brought back into use; however instead of running into the former Central station as the railway had done, the tracks were carried down into the streets by a new ramp just east of the former station.
British Rail built a new underpass at Cornbrook, in order for the tram line to pass under the Manchester to Warrington and Liverpool line, which the railway had previously connected to at the level. Thus taking the tramway from the former CLC viaduct and onto the former MSJ&AR route.
The two track alignment was separated, so one track was used for trams, and the other by trains, both operating bi-directionally. Mid-Cheshire Line trains which had previously used the Altrincham line into Manchester were then diverted via .

Phase one of the Metrolink opened in stages during 1992; from Bury to Victoria on 6 April 1992; the street running section from Victoria to G-Mex (now Deansgate–Castlefield) on 27 April; Deansgate–Castlefield to Altrincham on 15 June; then the branch to Piccadilly Railway station on 20 July.

Services
During the evenings, and on Sundays and bank holidays the frequency drops to 12 minutes and only run to Etihad Campus.

Rolling stock
All services are operated by M5000 trams. Between 1992 and 2009, the line was operated by the original fleet of 26 T-68 trams. From 2009 the new fleet of M5000 trams was introduced, and these replaced the original T-68 trams. which were withdrawn from service during 2012–14.

References

External links

 LRTA entry on this line
 Entry on this line from thetrams.co.uk

Manchester Metrolink lines
Rail transport in Greater Manchester
Railway lines opened in 1849
Former railway lines converted to Manchester Metrolink lines